The 2016 Toyota Tundra 250 was the 4th stock car race of the 2016 NASCAR Camping World Truck Series, and the 16th iteration of the event. The race was held on Friday, May 6, 2016, in Kansas City, Kansas at Kansas Speedway, a 1.5-mile (2.4 km) permanent tri-oval shaped racetrack. The race was increased from 167 laps to 170 laps, due to a NASCAR overtime finish. In a wild finish, William Byron, driving for Kyle Busch Motorsports, would take the upset win, after the leaders of Johnny Sauter and Ben Rhodes wrecked on the final lap. This was Byron's first career NASCAR Camping World Truck Series win. To fill out the podium, Matt Crafton, driving for ThorSport Racing, and Daniel Hemric, driving for Brad Keselowski Racing, would finish 2nd and 3rd, respectively.

Background 

Kansas Speedway is a  tri-oval race track in the Village West area near Kansas City, Kansas, United States. It was built in 2001 and it currently hosts two annual NASCAR race weekends. The IndyCar Series also held races at the venue until 2011. The speedway is owned and operated by NASCAR.

Entry list 

 (R) denotes rookie driver.
 (i) denotes driver who is ineligible for series driver points.

Practice

First practice 
The first practice session was held on Thursday, May 5, at 1:30 pm CST, and would last for 55 minutes.

Second practice 
The second practice session was held on Thursday, May 5, at 3:30 pm EST, and would last for 55 minutes.

Final practice 
The final practice session was held on Thursday, May 5, at 5:30 pm CST, and would last for 1 hour and 25 minutes.

Qualifying 
Qualifying was held on Friday, May 6, at 3:30 pm CST. Since Kansas Speedway is at least 1.5 miles (2.4 km) in length, the qualifying system was a single car, single lap, two round system where in the first round, everyone would set a time to determine positions 13–32. Then, the fastest 12 qualifiers would move on to the second round to determine positions 1–12.

Norm Benning and Mike Harmon would fail to qualify.

Full qualifying results

Race results

Standings after the race 

Drivers' Championship standings

Note: Only the first 8 positions are included for the driver standings.

References 

NASCAR races at Kansas Speedway
May 2016 sports events in the United States
2016 in sports in Kansas